AEW x NJPW: Forbidden Door is a professional wrestling pay-per-view (PPV) event co-promoted by the American promotion All Elite Wrestling (AEW) and the Japanese promotion New Japan Pro-Wrestling (NJPW). Established in 2022, it is held annually in June and features direct competition between wrestlers from the two promotions. The event takes its name from the same term often used by AEW when referring to working with other professional wrestling companies.

History
In February 2021, the American professional wrestling promotion All Elite Wrestling (AEW) started a partnership with the Japanese promotion, New Japan Pro-Wrestling (NJPW). Since then, both AEW and NJPW have had their wrestlers appear on each other's shows in the United States. On April 15, 2022, it was reported that a planned co-promoted event held by the two promotions was in the works.

On the April 20, 2022, episode of AEW Dynamite, AEW President Tony Khan introduced NJPW President Takami Ohbari to make a major announcement regarding their respective companies. They were interrupted by AEW wrestler Adam Cole, who officially announced that a co-promoted pay-per-view (PPV) event titled Forbidden Door would be held on June 26, 2022, at the United Center in Chicago, Illinois. The event took its name from the same term often used by AEW when referring to working with other professional wrestling promotions.

On March 15, 2023, a second Forbidden Door event between AEW and NJPW was scheduled to be held on June 25, 2023, at the Scotiabank Arena in Toronto, Ontario, Canada, thus establishing Forbidden Door as an annual event between the two companies.

Events

See also
List of All Elite Wrestling pay-per-view events
List of major NJPW events

References

External links

New Japan Pro-Wrestling shows
Professional wrestling joint events
Recurring events established in 2022